Chiara Borgogno (born ) is an Italian female volleyball player, playing as a Middle blocker. On club level she plays for LPM Mondovì.

References

1984 births
Living people
Italian women's volleyball players
Sportspeople from the Province of Cuneo